Austrochaperina parkeri is a species of frog in the family Microhylidae.
It is endemic to Papua New Guinea.
Its natural habitat is subtropical or tropical moist lowland forests.

References

Sources

Austrochaperina
Amphibians of Papua New Guinea
Taxonomy articles created by Polbot
Amphibians described in 2000